Indira Hridayesh (24 March 1941 – 13 June 2021) was an Indian politician, from the state of Uttarakhand. She was a member of the Indian National Congress party. Hridayesh was elected to the Uttar Pradesh Legislative Council for four terms, from 1974 to 2000. She was elected to the Uttarakahand Legislative Assembly in 2002, 2012, and 2017, and between 2002 and 2017, was the State Finance Minister for Uttarakhand. From 2017 onward, she was the leader of the Opposition for the Uttarakhand Legislative Assembly.

Biography 
Hridayesh was born on 24 March 1941, either in Allahabad or in Pilbhit, in Uttar Pradesh, according to sources. Her family was from Dasauli, in Uttar Pradesh. She had a master's degree and a doctorate. She had three sons. She was diagnosed with COVID-19, and underwent cardiac surgery in 2021. She died on 13 June 2021, of cardiac arrest.

Career 
Hridayesh entered active politics in the mid-1970s, as part of the Indian National Congress (INC) party. She won her first election in 1974, to the upper house of the state of Uttar Pradesh's bicameral legislature, i.e. the Uttar Pradesh Legislative Council. She won second, third and fourth terms to the Uttar Pradesh Legislative Council from 1986-1992, 1992-1998, and 1998-2000. Hridayesh represented Haldwani constituency, which was in undivided Uttar Pradesh. In 2000, after Uttar Pradesh was divided into smaller states, she became a member of the Interim Uttarakahand Legislative Assembly for the new state of Uttarakahand. She won three more terms to the Uttarakhand Legislative Assembly, from 2002-2007, 2012-2017, and 2017-2021. During her last term, she was leader of the opposition for the Uttarakhand Legislative Assembly.

From 2012 to 2017, she was the Minister of Finance for Uttarakhand, and also held the portfolio for parliamentary affairs, higher education, and planning, serving in successive governments headed by ND Tiwari, Vijay Bahuguna, and Harish Rawat. In 2014, she suggested that she would be a suitable candidate for Chief Minister of Uttarakhand, to replace the then-Chief Minister, Vijay Bahuguna, but her proposal was not accepted by the INC.

Hridayesh was considered an expert on parliamentary procedure, and was a key strategist for the INC in Uttarakahand politics.

Electoral history 
Hridayesh's electoral history is:

References

1941 births
2021 deaths
People from Ayodhya
Members of the Uttar Pradesh Legislative Council
Women members of the Uttarakhand Legislative Assembly
Indian National Congress politicians from Uttarakhand
Leaders of the Opposition in Uttarakhand
Finance Ministers of Uttarakhand
21st-century Indian women politicians
21st-century Indian politicians
Uttarakhand MLAs 2000–2002
Uttarakhand MLAs 2002–2007
Uttarakhand MLAs 2012–2017
Uttarakhand MLAs 2017–2022
Deaths from the COVID-19 pandemic in India